Jean-Pierre Michel (5 August 1938 – 24 January 2021) was a member of the Senate of France, representing the Haute-Saône department from 2004 to 2014.  He was a member of the Socialist Party. In 2014 he ran for a second term, but lost by a 57%-34% margin to Alain Joyandet and by a 60%-34% margin to mayor Michel Raison.

Michel died on 24 January 2021 at the age of 82.

Political career 

As part of the study of the bill opening marriage to same-sex couples, as rapporteur of the Committee on Laws, he declared on February 13, 2013: "Me, my position is that something is just [or fair] because that's what the law says, that's all. And the law does not refer to some natural order. It refers to a given balance of power at some point in time, period, nothing else." The philosopher Thibaud Collin interjects: "Ah, I see, the basis of justice is thus the result of a balance of power?" And the socialist rapporteur concludes: "This is my point of view, it is the Marxist point of view on law."(Starting at 1:40:01 in the full video of the committee hearing on the 13th of February 2013, can be found on YouTube but not linked to.)

Electoral history

References

External links
Page on the Senate website

1938 births
2021 deaths
French Senators of the Fifth Republic
Socialist Party (France) politicians
Senators of Haute-Saône